Walter Dexter may refer to:

 Walter F. Dexter (1886–1945), American educator and politician
 Walter Dexter (Canadian artist) (1931–2015), Canadian ceramic artist
 Walter L. Dexter (1841–1920), member of the Wisconsin State Assembly
 Walter Dexter (British artist) (1876–1958), British artist